The Whiteshell Laboratories, originally known as the Whiteshell Nuclear Research Establishment (WNRE) was an Atomic Energy of Canada (AECL) laboratory in Manitoba, northeast of Winnipeg. It was originally built as a home for the experimental WR-1 reactor, but over time came to host a variety of experimental systems, including a SLOWPOKE reactor (the SLOWPOKE Demonstration Reactor) and the Underground Research Laboratory to study nuclear waste disposal. Employment peaked in the early 1970s at about 1,300, but during the 1980s the experiments began to wind down, and in 2003 the decision was made to close the site.  the site is undergoing decommissioning with a planned completion date in 2024.

History
In the late 1950s, Atomic Energy Canada Limited (AECL) was planning an aggressive expansion of their experimental reactor designs. Among a number of proposals were versions of the heavy water reactor concept using alternate cooling arrangements including oil and boiling water. Their existing research site at the Chalk River Laboratories outside Ottawa appeared to be "at saturation" and too small to host all the planned experiments.

Considering their options, it was noted that only three provinces did not already host some sort of major federal lab, Newfoundland, Alberta and Manitoba. Newfoundland was eliminated, and Alberta already had an oil and gas industry and did not need more energy experiments. So, the decision was made to build in Manitoba. A preliminary site survey was carried out by Shawinigan Engineering (later part of Lavalin, today part of SNC-Lavalin). This was followed by meetings between AECL president J.L. Gray and Manitoba premier Dufferin Roblin.

In November 1959, Gray reported to the AECL board that a site on the Winnipeg River near the Seven Sisters Generating Station appeared to be suitable, along with a report from the federal government's housing agency that a new town site could be developed nearby. As the town was on the border of the Whiteshell Provincial Park, they named the lab Whiteshell. Manitoba was responsible for building a new bridge over the Winnipeg River and maintaining roads and other services. The town was developed as Pinawa, some distance to the southeast of the lab site.

A deal was signed on 21 July 1960, creating the Whiteshell Nuclear Research Establishment (WNRE). The site was selected to host the Organic-Cooled Deuterium-Reactor Experiment (OCDRE), which later became known as WR-1. The design needed to be ready for construction to start in April 1962. General Electric Canada built the reactor over a period of three years ending in June 1965, and the reactor achieved criticality on 1 November 1965. The idea of an oil-cooled version of the CANDU was eventually abandoned in 1972, and from then on the WR-1 was operated at low power settings in a purely experimental program.

Whiteshell led the development of the SLOWPOKE reactor, starting in 1967. However, the first example, SLOWPOKE-1, was built at Chalk River and reached criticality in 1970. Over the next decade, several SLOWPOKE-2 reactors were sold around the world. A larger version, SLOWPOKE-3, was designed to supply 10,000 kW of hot water for district heating. The SLOWPOKE Demonstration Reactor (SDR) was built at Whiteshell in the 1980s to test this concept. The project was terminated after market interest in a nuclear heating system dwindled, and the SDR reactor at Whiteshell remained the only SLOWPOKE-3 reactor ever built. The construction of SDR at Whiteshell began 1985 and the reactor started operation 1987 and was shut down 1989 and was decommissioned. Other major facilities included shielded hot cell facilities, research laboratories and radioactive waste management areas including the Whiteshell Used Fuel Storage Facility.

In 1974, AECL began an extensive program in nuclear waste disposal. Their general program would involve burial to shield the fuel for about three hundred years while the majority of the gamma ray sources burned out, followed by a much longer period of physical isolation, not necessarily underground, to ensure the remaining radionuclides did not enter the water supply. AECL eventually decided the entire waste storage period should be underground. They found a suitable test site in Canadian Shield rock about 50 km northwest of the main Whiteshell site. This led to the construction of the Underground Research Laboratory (URL) whose primary concern was measuring the stability of hard-rock burial and potential groundwater exchange. The facility was decommissioned and deliberately flooded in 2010 to perform one final experiment to examine how mine seals work in a water environment.

Other programs on the main site included the Containment Test Facility (CTF) that examined potential hydrogen explosion sources in the CANDU reactors, and the Large-Scale Vented Combustion Test Facility (LSVCTF) that examined the actual explosions. Work at these sites concluded that by following some basic precautions the possibility of such an explosion in a CANDU was remote, and was used to test the Passive Autocatalytic Recombiners (PAR) system developed to scavage trace amounts of hydrogen that might be present. The PAR would go on to be a successful export product for AECL.

Starting in 1984, Whiteshell began a collaboration with Los Alamos National Laboratory (LANL) to develop a nuclear battery for powering the North Warning System radars. This developed into an active generator using an Organic Rankine cycle generator.

Whiteshell ran a number of life sciences programs over the years. In 1966, two 19 m diameter plastic-lined "ponds" were built, one of which held a cesium-137 source. The ten-year program measured the spread of the caesium in the water, and by comparing the two ponds, its effect on the life forms in them. In 1973 they constructed the Field Irradiator Gamma (FIG) experiment, which fenced off a 1 km area of forest and exposed it to a powerful cesium-137 gamma radiation source in a central tower. The program ran until 1986, and concluded that it required 100,000 times the natural background to kill pine trees. A similar experiment started the next year in 1974, the ZEUS (Zoological Environment Under Stress) experiment, which set aside six 1-hectare meadow areas in 1974 and carried out long-term radioactive releases to measure the results. They were mostly interested in the effects on meadow voles, but did not reach any conclusions.

In 1998, AECL decided to close Whiteshell Laboratories and many of the facilities and activities have since ceased active operation. , many of the original facilities are shut down, but work on WR-1 is ongoing. The site is planned to be entirely decommissioned by 2024.

Timeline
Timeline for the facility:
 1963 - AECL builds the Whiteshell Laboratories nuclear research facility.
 1980 - AECL receives $40-million in funding to construct the Underground Research Laboratory (URL).
 1983 - Construction of the URL begins.
 1985 - URL opens
 1998 - Work begins to decommission the Whiteshell laboratory
 2010 - Underground Research Laboratory is officially closed
 2015 - The decommissioning of WR-1 is planned to start

See also
 Atomic Energy of Canada Limited
 Petkau effect

References

Bibliography
 

The main Whiteshell site is located here: 
The Underground Research Laboratory site is here: 

Atomic Energy of Canada Limited
Nuclear research institutes
Research institutes in Manitoba
Eastman Region, Manitoba
Science and technology in Manitoba